Senator Chilton may refer to:

Horace Chilton (1853–1932), U.S. Senator from Texas from 1891 to 1892 and from 1895 to 1901
William E. Chilton (1858–1939), U.S. Senator from West Virginia from  1911 to 1917